Kazan Operation was the Red Army's offensive (5–10 September 1918) against the Czechoslovak Legion and the People Army of Komuch during the Russian Civil War.

Background 
Following the capture of Samara by the Czech Legion on 8 June, several members of the Constituent Assembly, which had been dissolved by the Bolsheviks, organized a Committee of Members of the Constituent Assembly (in Russian "Constituent Assembly" was "Uchreditel'noe Sobranie", hence the abbreviation for Committee was "Komuch"). This threatened to form an alternative socialist government to the Bolshevik regime.
In August 1918, the Whites occupied Kazan. Bolshevik forces were defeated, and they dispersed to Kazan's neighborhood. The Whites killed the remaining of Bolsheviks in the city, including Mullanur Waxitov.

The Fifth Army has been assigned the task of taking Kazan. Our enemy is trying to break through from Kazan to Nizhny Novgorod, Perm, Vyatka and Vologda, to link up with the Anglo-French troops, and to crush the heart of the workers’ revolution – Moscow. But before Kazan stand the workers’ and peasants’ regiments of the Red Army. They know what their task is: to prevent the enemy from taking a single step forward: to wrest Kazan from his grasp: to throw back the Czech mercenaries and the officer-thugs, drown them in the Volga, and crush their criminal mutiny against the workers’ revolution. In this conflict we are using not only rifles, cannon and machine guns, but also newspapers. For the newspaper is also a weapon. The newspaper binds together all units of the Fifth Army in one thought, one aspiration, one will. Forward to Kazan! Leon Trotsky August 1918

At the beginning of the operation, the Reds' disposition was as follows: To the west of Kazan were the Fifth Army of the Eastern Front under Pēteris Slavens and the Volga Flotilla under Fyodor Raskolnikov; to the east of Kazan was the Arsk group of the Second Army under Woldemar Azin. They opposed the Czechoslovak legion and KomUch People's Army under A. P. Stepanov.

The battle 
On September 7, the Right Bank Group of the Fifth Army with the flotilla's backing reached the right (west) bank of Volga and shelled Kazan from the commanding position of Uslan Hill. The Left Bank Group reached the mouth of the Kazanka River. That day the Arsk Group took Kinderle and Klyki villages to the east of Kazan. On September 9, sailors and landed marksmen under Nikolay Markin took the beachhead at the western part of Kazan. On that day the Left Bank Group and Arsk Group joined and laid siege to part of Kazan. On September 10, after storming the city from three directions, Red Army troops took control of Kazan.

The majority of Whites managed to sail away via the Volga.

Aftermath 
The capturing of Kazan and Simbirsk by the Red Army made continued strategic offensives westwards possible for the Red Army.

References and notes

Sources 
 Н.Е.Какурин, И.И.Вацетис "Гражданская война. 1918-1921" (N.E.Kakurin, I.I.Vacietis "Civil War. 1918-1921") - Sankt-Peterburg, "Polygon" Publishing House, 2002. 

Battles of the Russian Civil War
History of Tatarstan
History of Kazan
Czechoslovak Legion
Battles involving Bohemia
1918 in Russia
Conflicts in 1918
September 1918 events
Kazan